Adjutant was a Kriegsmarine (German Navy) commerce raider that served during World War II.

Built as the Norwegian whaler Pol IX, she was captured on 14 January 1941 by the German auxiliary cruiser Pinguin. She was renamed Adjutant and used as a commerce raider. Captained by Adjutant Hemmer and used a first as a scout, she then was used as a minelayer in the South Atlantic Ocean and Indian Ocean. She was scuttled in the Pacific Ocean on 1 July 1941 by the German auxiliary cruiser Komet after suffering engine trouble off the Chatham Islands.

References
http://www.wrecksite.eu/wreck.aspx?141780
http://www.warsailors.com/singleships/pol.html
http://www.teesbuiltships.co.uk/smiths/19301944/polix1937.htm

1937 ships
Ships built on the River Tees
World War II mine warfare vessels of Germany
World War II shipwrecks in the Pacific Ocean
Maritime incidents in July 1941
Auxiliary ships of the Kriegsmarine
Scuttled vessels of Germany
Captured ships